Satan in Goray (Yiddish translit.: Der sotn in Goray: a mayse fun fartsaytns; "Satan in Goray: A Tale of the Old Times") is a novel by Isaac Bashevis Singer. It was originally published between January and September 1933 in installments in the Yiddish literary magazine  Globus in Poland and in 1935 it was printed as a book. It was Singer's first published novel.

Plot
The novel describes a Jewish life in a Polish village of Goray after the massacres of the Cossack riots during the Khmelnitsky Uprising of 1648, which was influenced by the teachings of the false messiah Sabbatai Zevi in desperate hopes for messiah and redemption. The Jewry is split into two factions: traditionalists and Sabbateans. Eventually the news had come to Goray that Sabbatai Zevi converted to Islam. This was taken in Goray that the way to redemption is to embrace the evil. The strange rites culminate in the possession of one of Sabbatai's prophetesses with dybbuk. Since the Sabbatean's movement vaned, a true believer in Torah came and exorcised the dybbuk.  The last segment of the novel is stylized as a 17th century document about "the dybbuk of Goray".

Discussion
Ken Frieden asserts that the novel "anticipates Singer’s later fascination with demons". Meyer Levin wrote that the novel is "folk material transmuted into literature" and praised the English translation.

Dar Williams' song "And a God Descended" (from The Green World album) uses imagery from the story to contemplate faith gone awry.

Translations
The English translation (from Yiddish) was made by Jacob Sloan with the author's help and published by Noonday Press in  1955.
The German translation was based on Sloan's English version by Ulla Hengst and printed by Rowohlt Verlag, 1969, 
Polish: Szatan w Goraju translated by Józef Marzęcki, Szymon Sal, 1992, 
Czech: Satan v Goraji translated by Jan Skoumal, Argo, 2003
Russian: "Сатана в Горае" translated by Yisroel Nekrasov, 2009
Italian: "Satana a Goraj" translated by Elisabetta Zevi, Adelphi Edizioni, 2018.

References

1933 debut novels
Novels by Isaac Bashevis Singer
Novels first published in serial form
Works originally published in literary magazines
Novels set in Poland
Khmelnytsky Uprising
Novels set in the 1650s